Arno Suurorg (born Arnold Friedrich Grossthal; 18 July 1903 – 3 January 1960) was an Estonian stage, film and radio actor and producer whose career spanned nearly forty years.

Biography

Early life
Suurorg was born in Piirsalu, he was the eldest of two children born to Jüri Grossthal and Maria Hansen; his younger sister Helmi was born in 1908. The family would later change their surname to the more Estonian Suurorg when the children were young. His mother Maria was the younger sister of writer A. H. Tammsaare, whose pentalogy Truth and Justice is considered one of the major works of 20th-century Estonian literature.

Career
Beginning in 1922, Suurorg would spend nearly forty years performing at the Estonian Drama Theatre and would also produce a number of plays at the theatre. He would also appear in a number of radio plays.

Aside from theatre and radio, Suurorg appeared in a number of films. He made his film debut in the 1955 Estonian drama Jahid merel (English: Yachts at Sea); followed by the Herbert Rappaport directed Andruse õnn the same year. His most prominent film role was that of the charchter Lindkvist in the 1959 drama Veealused karid, based on the Aadu Hint-penned play Kuhu lähed, seltsimees direktor?.

Death
Arno Suurorg died on 3 January 1960 in Tallinn at age 56.

Acknowledgements
In 1946, Arno Suurorg was awarded the Merited Artist of the Estonian SSR.

References

External links

Photograph of Arno Suurorg at Fotis: Rahvusarhiivi Fotode Andmebaas
1958 Portrait of Arno Suurorg painted by Roman Treumann at Eesti Teatri- ja Muusikamuuseumi maaligalerii

1903 births
1960 deaths
People from Lääne-Nigula Parish
People from the Governorate of Estonia
Estonian male stage actors
Estonian male film actors
20th-century Estonian male actors